Rome Express is a 1932 British thriller film directed by Walter Forde and starring Esther Ralston and Conrad Veidt. Based on a story by Clifford Grey, with a screenplay by Sidney Gilliat, the film is a tale about a European express train to Rome carrying diverse characters, including thieves, adulterers, blackmail victims, and an American film star. The film won the American National Board of Review award for Best Foreign Film. Rome Express was remade as Sleeping Car to Trieste (1948).

It was shot at the Lime Grove Studios in Shepherd's Bush. The film's sets were designed by the art director Andrew Mazzei, with the costume design by Gordon Conway.

Plot
The film is centred almost entirely on the Compagnie Internationale des Wagons-Lits train the Rome Express, travelling between Paris and Rome.

Just as the train is departing from a station in Paris, Zurta and his colleague Tony just manage to board the train. They have found out that someone they want to see is on board. Another passenger, McBain, a wealthy businessman travelling with his brow-beaten secretary/valet, Mills, learns that a painting by Van Dyck, which he had previously tried to buy and which had later been stolen, has not been recovered and says he would  do anything to obtain it. Also on the train are an adulterous couple, an annoyingly sociable Englishman, a French police inspector, and an American film star who is tiring of her fame, accompanied by her manager/publicist.

It transpires that the stolen painting is in the possession of a man, Poole, who conspicuously keeps his briefcase close to him at all times. When he agrees to join a poker game, he finds that one of the other players is Zurta, and Poole's reaction shows that they know each other. Poole is disconcerted and carelessly sets down his briefcase, which is later innocently taken by Mills, who has a similar briefcase.

After the game ends, Zurta follows Poole to his compartment, forces his way in and confronts Poole, who offers to hand over the painting but finds he has the wrong briefcase. After Zurta threatens to throw him from the train, they struggle and Poole is killed.

Meanwhile, McBain discovers in Mills' briefcase the stolen Van Dyck he had wanted to buy. When Poole's body is discovered by an attendant, the police inspector begins an investigation and interviews all those who have been in contact with Poole. Zurta learns that the briefcases have been switched and tries to recover it from McBain's compartment, but is apprehended by McBain and Mills until the inspector arrives. Then Mills discovers the stolen painting hidden in McBain's compartment and realizes that McBain found it. He tries to use it to blackmail McBain, but McBain outwits him and takes it to the police. As the police inspector begins to suspect him, Zurta leaps from the train in an attempt to escape, but is killed.

Cast
Esther Ralston as Asta Marvelle
Conrad Veidt as Zurta
Harold Huth as George Grant
Cedric Hardwicke as Alistair McBain
Joan Barry as Mrs Maxted
Gordon Harker as Tom Bishop
Donald Calthrop as Poole
Hugh Williams as Tony
Frank Vosper as M. Jolif
Finlay Currie as Sam the Publicist
Eliot Makeham as Mills
Muriel Aked as Spinster

Back story
Like the post-war remake of this film, Sleeping Car to Trieste (1948), details of the 'back story' of the film are few. Zurta appears to be a professional criminal who organised the art theft. McBain has previously attempted to buy the painting.

References

External links

1932 films
British thriller films
British black-and-white films
British detective films
1930s thriller films
Films directed by Walter Forde
Films set on trains
Films set in Paris
Films set in Rome
Films shot at Lime Grove Studios
Gainsborough Pictures films
1930s English-language films
1930s British films